Peter Pan is a 1984 video game published by Hodder & Stoughton.

Gameplay
Peter Pan is a game in which the player takes on the character of Peter Pan and encounters characters such as Captain Hook, Wendy, Tinkerbell, the crocodile, the Indians and Pirates.

Reception
Bill Hoare reviewed Peter Pan for Imagine magazine, and stated: "All in all, Peter Pan is an excellent Adventure which should appeal especially to the younger enthusiast and as such it is to be highly recommended."

See also 

 List of ZX Spectrum games
 List of works based on Peter Pan

References

External links
 
Review in Your Spectrum
Review in Sinclair Programs
Review in Micro Adventurer
Text of review from Sinclair User #33
Text of additional reviews at Spectrum Computing

1984 video games
1980s interactive fiction
Adventure games
Interactive fiction based on works
Peter Pan video games
Video games developed in the United Kingdom
ZX Spectrum games
ZX Spectrum-only games